Richard Raymond may refer to:

Richard Raymond (MP) (died 1418), in 1410 MP for Exeter
Richard Allen Raymond, incumbent Under Secretary for Food Safety in the US
Richard Raymond (Ontario politician), candidate for a 2003 Ontario Legislative Assembly election
Richard Raymond (Texas politician) (born 1960), member of the Texas House of Representatives
Richard Raymond (pianist) (born 1965), Canadian pianist